Nicholas de Aquila (died after 1220) was a medieval Bishop of Chichester-elect.

Life

Aquila was a canon lawyer. He may be the master of the school at Avranches in 1198, but was Dean of Chichester before February 1201. He was nominated as bishop in 1209, but was never consecrated. His election was quashed about 1214. He was named Dean of Avranches by 1211 and died sometime after 26 May 1220.

Notes

Citations

References

Further reading

 

Deans of Chichester
Bishops of Chichester
13th-century deaths
Year of birth unknown
13th-century English Roman Catholic bishops